Unnatural History may refer to:
Unnatural History (album), a compilation album by Coil
Unnatural History (film), a 1959 Merrie Melodies cartoon
Unnatural History (novel), a 1999 novel based on the British science fiction TV series Doctor Who
Unnatural History (TV series), an American television series

See also
Unnatural Histories, British television series
Natural history (disambiguation)